Nicolas Hajj, BS (born on 30 June 1907 in Machgara, Lebanon - died on 12 January 1995) was a Melkite Greek Catholic Archbishop of the Melkite Greek Catholic Archeparchy of Baniyas.

Life

Nicolas Hajj was ordained to the priesthood on April 1, 1934 as Chaplain of the Melkite Basilian  of the Most Holy Redeemer Order. On 30 July 1965, he was appointed as archbishop and his ordination was performed per hac vice and became Auxiliary Bishop in the Melkite Patriarchate of Antioch and titular Archbishop of Damietta of Greek Melkites. On September 9, 1965, he was consecrated bishop by Patriarch of Antioch Maximos IV Sayegh, SMSP consecrated bishop. His co-consecrators were the archbishops Pierre Kamel Medawar, SMSP and Néophytos Edelby, BA.

On November 3, 1984 Nicolas Hajj was appointed Archbishop of Banyas in Lebanon. For age-related reasons, he resigned his office on September 18, 1985 and became emeritus archbishop until his death on January 12, 1995. From 14 September to 8 December 1965 he was a participant at the fourth session of the Second Vatican Council. Archbishop Hajj was co-consecrator of the Archbishops Saba Youakim, BS, Denys Gaith, BC, François Abou Mokh, BS, Jean Mansour, SMSP, Ignace Raad and André Haddad, BS.

References

External links
 http://www.catholic-hierarchy.org/bishop/bhajj.html
 http://www.gcatholic.org/dioceses/diocese/bani0.htm

1907 births
1995 deaths
Lebanese Melkite Greek Catholics
Melkite Greek Catholic bishops
People from Machghara